Pinus pumila, commonly known as the Siberian dwarf pine, dwarf Siberian pine, dwarf stone pine, Japanese stone pine, or creeping pine, is a tree in the family Pinaceae native to northeastern Asia and the Japanese isles. It shares the common name creeping pine with several other plants.

Description

The leaves are needle-like, formed in bundles of five and are 4–6 centimetres long. The cones are 2.5–4.5 cm long, with large nut-like seeds (pine nuts).

Distribution
The range covers the Far East, Eastern Siberia, north-east of Mongolia, north-east of China, northern Japan and Korea. Siberian dwarf pine can be found along mountain chains, above the tree line, where it forms dense, uninterrupted thickets; it also grows on the headlands above the Okhotsk and Bering Seas, Tatarsk and Pacific coast (the Kurils).

P. pumila grows very slowly. It can live up to 300 and, in some instances, 1,000 years.  In the colder conditions of Siberia, there are specimens which are 250 years old and older.

Ecology 
The seeds are harvested and dispersed by the spotted nutcracker (Nucifraga caryocatactes).

Cultivation 
This plant is grown as an ornamental shrub in parks and gardens. The cultivar P. pumila 'Glauca' has gained the Royal Horticultural Society's Award of Garden Merit.

See also 

 Pinus pumila × P. sibirica

References

External links
 Conifers Around the World: Pinus pumila - Hai-Matsu.
 
 

pumila
Flora of China
Flora of Eastern Asia
Flora of Mongolia
Flora of the Russian Far East
Flora of Siberia
Edible nuts and seeds